Stefi is a feminine given name. Notable people with the name include:

 Stefi Baum (born 1958), American astronomer
 Stefi Geyer (1888–1956), Hungarian violinist
 Stefi Talman (born 1958), Swiss shoe designer

Feminine given names